Serhiy Melinyshyn (born 26 May 1997) is a Ukrainian professional footballer who plays as a defender for Polish III liga side ŁKS Łagów.

Career
Melinyshyn is a product of the Sportive youth school of FC Karpaty Lviv.

He made his debut for FC Volyn Lutsk played as a main-squad player in the game against FC Shakhtar Donetsk on 24 September 2016 in the Ukrainian Premier League.

References

External links 

 

1997 births
Living people
Sportspeople from Lviv
Ukrainian footballers
Association football defenders
Ukrainian Premier League players
Ukrainian First League players
Ukrainian Second League players
III liga players
FC Volyn Lutsk players
FC Olimpik Donetsk players
FC Prykarpattia Ivano-Frankivsk (1998) players
FC Karpaty Halych players
Ukrainian expatriate footballers
Expatriate footballers in Kyrgyzstan
Expatriate footballers in Poland
Ukrainian expatriate sportspeople in Poland